North China Sea Fleet, China Marine Surveillance, founded on August 18, 1999, was under command of both North China Sea Branch, State Oceanic Administration and China Marine Surveillance.

Overview 
North China Sea Fleet (CMS)'s headquarters is at Sifang, Qingdao, Shandong.

Organization 
 1st Marine Surveillance Flotilla. Homeport: Qingdao, Shandong.
 2nd Marine Surveillance Flotilla. Homeport: Tianjin.
 3rd Marine Surveillance Flotilla (. Homeport: Dalian, Liaoning.
 North China Sea Air Wing. Base:?

References 

China Marine Surveillance
Yellow Sea
Bohai Sea